Cherry Kicks is the second studio album by Swedish rock band Caesars Palace.

Track listing
"Right About Time" – 2:50
"Subhuman Girl" – 2:31
"Crackin' Up" – 3:14
"One Good Night" – 4:04
"Spill Your Guts" – 2:47
"Since You've Been Gone" – 3:15
"Oh Yeah?" – 3:12
"Punkrocker" – 6:20
"Fun & Games" – 2:23 (Originally by Junior Byles)
"From the Bughouse" – 2:51
"Only You" – 2:33
"Cherry Kicks" – 4:00

References

2000 albums
Caesars (band) albums
Virgin Records albums